Colin Forbes may refer to:

 Colin Forbes (graphic designer) (1928–2022), British graphic designer
 Colin Forbes (ice hockey) (born 1976), Canadian former ice hockey forward
 Colin Forbes (rugby union) (born 1932), rugby union player who represented Australia
 Colin Forbes, pseudonym for Raymond Harold Sawkins (1923–2006), British novelist